Kenia may refer to:

People 
Levan Kenia, Georgian footballer
Kenia Arias, American singer-songwriter
Kenia Enríquez (born 1993), Mexican boxer
Kenia Jayantilal, Indian cricketer
Kenia Lechuga (born 1994), Mexican Olympic rower
Kenia López Rabadán (born 1974), Mexican politician
Kenia Moreta (born 1981), Dominican Republic volleyball player
Kenia Olvera (born 1975), Mexican volleyball player
Kenia Os (born Kenia Osuna in 1999), Mexican singer, songwriter and model
Kenia Rangel (born 1995), Panamanian footballer
Kenia Rodríguez, Cuban Olympic judoka
Kenia Seoane Lopez, American attorney and judge
Kenia Sinclair, Jamaican runner
Kenias Tembo (born 1955), Zimbabwean Olympic long-distance runner

See also
 Kenya (disambiguation)